Chad Aquino (born January 14, 1982) is an American former professional boxer who competed from 2004 to 2006. As an amateur, he won the 2001 National Golden Gloves at light welterweight.

Early life
Aquino was born in Kansas City, Missouri.

Amateur career
Aquino is the 2001 Golden Gloves Champion at light welterweight.

Professional career
On April 22, 2005 with a solid left to the jaw of Terrance Jett, Aquino took his fourth victory. It was the first fight on the ESPN's Friday Night Fights card.

References

External links

Living people
1982 births
American male boxers
Welterweight boxers
Southpaw boxers
American boxers of Mexican descent
Boxers from Missouri
Sportspeople from Kansas City, Missouri